Eric Cain (1954-1984) was an Australian former professional rugby league footballer who played in the 1970s. He played for Western Suburbs and South Sydney in the NSWRL competition.

Playing career
Cain played his junior rugby league for Zetland in the South Sydney district. He made his first grade debut for South Sydney in the 1972 NSWRFL season scoring a try. Cain made 41 appearances for South Sydney across all grades in his time at the club. After having not played first grade rugby league for five years, Cain signed for Western Suburbs in 1978. Cain played 22 games throughout the 1978 NSWRFL season as the club claimed the Minor Premiership. Cain also played for Wests in the major semi-final loss against Cronulla and the preliminary final defeat to Manly. The following season, Cain played 14 games for Western Suburbs as they again reached the finals. Cain played in their elimination final loss to Canterbury. This would also be Cain's final game in the top grade.

References

1954 births
1984 deaths
Western Suburbs Magpies players
South Sydney Rabbitohs players
Australian rugby league players
Rugby league wingers